Askeran may refer to:

 Askeran Region, NKR
 Askeran (town)
 Askeran District (NKAO)
 Askeran Fortress
 Askeran clash, a violent conflict on 22—23 February 1988 in the town of Askeran that was one of the starting points of Armenian-Azerbaijani conflict